Daljit Singh (born 24 June 1976) is a former Indian football player who represented JCT, Mohun Bagan clubs and the India football team.

Honours

India
SAFF Championship: 1999
 South Asian Games Bronze medal: 1999

References

External links
 https://web.archive.org/web/20120815190921/http://www.indianfootball.com/en/statistic/player/detail/playerId/190

1976 births
Living people
Indian footballers
India international footballers
JCT FC players
I-League players
Footballers from Hoshiarpur
Association football defenders
Mohun Bagan AC players
South Asian Games medalists in football
South Asian Games bronze medalists for India